Benedikt Wagner (born 14 June 1990) is a German fencer, team World champion in 2014. At the 2012 Summer Olympics, he competed in the Men's sabre, but was defeated in the third round by his teammate Nicolas Limbach, the German team which he was a member of were knocked out in the quarterfinals.  He also won the European Championship in 2016.

References

External links

 
 
 
 

German male fencers
Living people
Olympic fencers of Germany
Fencers at the 2012 Summer Olympics
Sportspeople from Bonn
1990 births
Fencers at the 2020 Summer Olympics